Ola Wikander (born 8 October 1981) is a Swedish writer, translator and theologian.

Contributions 
He has written the book I döda språks sällskap (2006), which is about extinct languages, translations, and among other things, the Babylonian creation story of Enûma Eliš. In May 2008 came his first novel, Poeten och cirkelmakaren, which he has written with his father Örjan Wikander.

Wikander's review of the history of Proto-Indo-European language (2008) has been well received by reviewers in both Svenska Dagbladet and Dagens Nyheter. In 2010, Ola Wikander received the Clio Prize. Price motivation sounded "for their commitment to extinct languages and the keys that their vocabulary and development provide to our oldest cultural history".

Education 
In June 2012, Wikander defended his doctorate for theology in the subject of the Old Testament exegesis at the Centrum för teologi och religionsvetenskap (Center for Theology and Religious Studies) at Lund.

Bibliography 
2003 – Kanaaneiska myter och legender
2005 – Enuma elish: det babyloniska skapelseeposet
2006 – I döda språks sällskap: en bok om väldigt gamla språk
2008 – De kaldeiska oraklen
2008 – Poeten och cirkelmakaren
2008 – Ett träd med vida grenar: de indoeuropeiska språkens historia
2010 – Orden och evigheten
2012 – Drought, Death and the Sun in Ugarit and Ancient Israel
2012 – Serafers drömmar
2014 – Gud är ett verb – tankar om Gamla testamentet och dess idéhistoria
2015 – Den trettonde funktionen

Prizes and awards 
2005 - Letterstedtska award for the translation of Canaanite myths and legends
2006 - August Prize
2009 - Zibetsk Prize
2010 - The Clio Prize

References 

1981 births
Living people
Swedish writers
Swedish historians of religion
Academic staff of Lund University
Swedish-language writers
Swedish translators